Club Atlético Platense is an Argentine sports club based in Florida, Buenos Aires.

Although the club hosts many activities, Platense is mostly known for its football team. Despite being relegated from the Primera División in 1999, it remains on the top 20 of the All-time Argentine Primera División table. Platense currently competes in the Argentine Primera División, the top division of the Argentine league system. The team was recently promoted after beating Estudiantes de Río Cuarto in the "Torneo Reducido" final.

History

Founded on 25 May 1905, Platense played in the second division from 1956 to 1964, and from 1972 to 1976, when the team finally won its first title, the Primera B championship that allowed Platense to play in the Primera División. The club achieved cult status in the late 1970s as they repeatedly staved off relegation through a series of "last-day miracles" (relegating other teams as Temperley after defeating them in decisive matches played to keep a place in the first division. Platense survived at the top level of Argentine football until finally succumbing to relegation in 1999.

This would be the beginning of a steep decline: Platense was subsequently relegated to the regionalised third division, Primera B Metropolitana, at the end of the 2001–02 season. On 17 May 2006, Platense won its second title and was promoted back to the Argentine second division Nacional B. But on 8 May 2010 The Squid would be relegated again to the third category.
On 2 May 2018, Platense was directly promoted to the second division after winning the Primera B Metropolitana title in a victory over club Estudiantes de Caseros. In 2021, Platense would make their return to the Primera División for the first time in 22 years after defeating Estudiantes de Río Cuarto on penalties to earn promotion.

The club's main claim to fame during these lean years is the success of Momo and David Trezeguet, who had debuted at Platense but after playing only 5 matches in Argentine Primera División was transferred to AS Monaco. 

Platense's fans base can be found in Vicente López, Olivos and Florida towns (all of them part of the Vicente López Partido), as well as in Villa Urquiza and Saavedra neighbourhoods. The club is also cited in Bioy Casares's book El Sueño de los héroes ("Dream of Heroes" ). Among its supporters, the Tango music singer Roberto Goyeneche and the British author Chris Moss were probably the most notable fans.

Statistics
In Primera División:
 Best position: 2nd. place in 1949
 Longest victory : 8–0 to Argentino de Quilmes in 1939
 All-time top scorer: Daniel Vega with 77 goals
 All-time most capped player: Enrique Topini (1959–73), with 324 games
 Seasons in First División: 73
 Seasons in Second Division: 24
 Seasons in Third Division: 12

Kit evolution and rare models

 1 Considered the "traditional" team uniform and worn most of the times.

Squad

Current squad
.

Out on loan

Honours
 Primera B (3): 1976, 2005–06, 2017–18

References

External links

 

 
Association football clubs established in 1905
1905 establishments in Argentina
Football clubs in Buenos Aires Province